SMS Dresden may refer to one of these ships in the German Imperial Navy:

 , a  launched in 1907
 , a  launched in 1916

German Navy ship names